Mark St. Germain is an American playwright, author, and film and television writer.

Career

Plays
St. Germain has written Camping With Henry And Tom (Outer Critics Circle and Lucille Lortel Awards), Out of Gas On Lover's Leap, Forgiving Typhoid Mary (Time Magazines "Year's Ten Best"), Ears On A Beatle, The God Committee, The Collyer Brothers At Home, The Gifts of The Magi (co-written with Randy Courts), The Book of the Dun Cow (co-written by Randy Courts), Johnny Pye and the Fool-Killer (winner of an AT&T "New Plays For The Nineties Award"), Jack's Holiday, the award-winning children's book Three Cups, and Stand By Your Man: The Tammy Wynette Story.

As a dramatist, St. Germain shows a strong preference for historical fiction.

Recent works include:
ELEANOR, a one-person show about the most famous First Lady in the world, premiering at Barrington Stage and starring Harriet Harris.

DAD, an autobiographical play, presented at Great Barrington Public Theater. PUBLIC SPEAKING 101 will premiere at the Great Barrington Public Theater in the summer of 2022.

Becoming Dr. Ruth, which reveals the little-known but remarkable history of German-born Karola Ruth Siegel, who fled the Nazis in the Kindertransport before joining the Haganah in Jerusalem as a sniper and scout, struggling as a single mother in America, and, ultimately, becoming known as American TV sex expert Dr. Ruth Westheimer. The one-woman play initially known as Becoming Dr. Ruth, directed by Julianne Boyd and set in 1997, opened Off Broadway at the Westside Theatre. Actress Debra Jo Rupp played the role of Dr. Ruth. Eileen DeSandre played Dr. Ruth in the Virginia Repertory Theatre production of Becoming Dr. Ruth. In 2021, actress Tovah Feldshuh has played Dr. Ruth.
Scott and Hem in the Garden of Allah, premiering in 2013, explores an evening at Los Angeles' notorious Garden of Allah apartments with F. Scott Fitzgerald and Ernest Hemingway.

His play Freud's Last Session premiered in the summer of 2009, at the Barrington Stage Company, and ran at the New World Stages in New York City.  Freud's Last Session began its New York previews on July 9, 2010, and officially opened on July 22, 2010. In 2011, Freud's Last Session won the Best Play Award from the off-Broadway Alliance.

In 2011, St. Germain's play The Best of Enemies premiered at the Barrington Stage Company in Pittsfield, Massachusetts. Based on the nonfiction book of the same name by Osha Gray Davidson, the play dramatizes the relationship between C.P. Ellis (a local KKK leader) and Ann Atwater (an African-American civil rights organizer) during a racially tense period in the desegregation of Durham, North Carolina schools.

In 2014, St. Germain premiered his eighth play, Dancing Lessons, at Barrington Stage Company. The play ran from January 6 to February 7, 2016, at Orlando Shakespeare Theater as part of their 2015–16 Signature Series. The show was produced at Florida Studio Theatre in Sarasota, Florida as a part of their 2014–2015 Mainstage Season. Florida Studio Theatre has partnered with St. Germain to workshop many of his works in progress.

His relationship with Barrington Stage—the Pittsfield, Massachusetts, regional theatre where virtually all of St. Germain's recent works have premiered—was memorialized in 2012 when the troupe's Stage 2 venue was renamed the St. Germain Stage.

Television and film

His television credits include The Cosby Show (writer/creative consultant), Crime & Punishment and The Wright Verdicts. He was also a script writer on the CBS Daytime serial As the World Turns. He co-wrote the screenplay for Carroll Ballard's Duma.

Books

He has written THREE CUPS, a children's book, WALKING EVIL, a comedic memoir and a thriller THE MIRROR MAN.

Documentary

As a personal project, he directed and co-produced the documentary "MY DOG: An Unconditional Love Story", featuring, among others, Richard Gere, Glenn Close, and Lynn Redgrave.

Membership
He is an alumnus of New Dramatists, where he was given the Joe A. Callaway Award; a member of the Dramatists Guild, the Writer's Guild East and a Board Member of the Barrington Stage Company. He was awarded the "New Voices In American Theatre" award at the William Inge Theatre Festival.

References

External links

"Scott and Hem in the Garden of Allah" Barrington Stage production notes
"Dr. Ruth, All the Way" Barrington Stage production notes
"Mark St. Germain's God Committee Convenes Off-Broadway" Playbill, March 11, 2006
"There Is No God", Playbill, April 14, 2006, article about The God Committee, Robert Simonson
"The God Committee" review by Joseph N. Feinstein, Showmag
The God Committee - production at Chagrin Valley Little Theatre, 2007, webpage
"Blanche and Her Joy Boys" - Berkshires Week, Jeffrey Borak, October 9, 2003
Duma, the movie - Warner Bros.
"Whale Scales", Iris Fanger, review of Moby Dick, An American Opera, May 10, 2001

American soap opera writers
American dramatists and playwrights
Year of birth missing (living people)
Living people